The Nanaimo NightOwls are a collegiate summer baseball team located in Nanaimo, British Columbia. The Night Owls are members of the West Coast League and began play in 2022; they play their home games at Serauxmen Stadium.

History
The Nanaimo NightOwls were announced to the public on 15 July, 2020 with the ball clubs name paying homage to the Nanaimo Owls baseball team of the 1920s, whilst the 'night' in the name refers to the work that the City of Nanaimo's undertook to install floodlights at Serauxmen Stadium. On the same day, the teams mascot was also announced; Ney-te (pronounced 'Nate') the NightOwl was named in honour of former mayor of Nanaimo Frank Ney. A month later, it was announced that former Georgia State Head Coach Greg Frady would serve as the teams inaugural Coach. One month after his appointment, Frady announced his first signings for the club; a quartet of players affiliated with Illinois State, three of whom had Canadian passports. This group was made up of infielders Aidan Huggins and Nick Gile, outfielder Dayton Peters and right-handed pitcher Chase Florendine.

Name
The Nanaimo NightOwls are unusual among sports teams in that they have two names; the Nanaimo NightOwls and the Nanaimo Bars. Named after the dessert of the same name, Nanaimo Bars had been the most requested name by the fans when asked to name the team. Games that are played during the day will see the club go by the Bars moniker, whilst evening games will be played under the guise of the NightOwls. To this end, the team partnered with supermarket chain Save-On-Foods in order to stock away game concessions stands with Nanaimo bars.

References

External links
 Nanaimo NightOwls
 

Amateur baseball teams in Canada
Baseball teams in British Columbia
Sport in Nanaimo
Baseball teams established in 2020
2020 establishments in British Columbia